So Tonight That I Might See is the second studio album by American alternative rock band Mazzy Star, released on October 5, 1993.

The album's first track, "Fade into You", became the band's first and only single to make the Billboard Hot 100 chart, peaking at number 44, and also charted at number 48 on the UK Singles Chart.

Critical reception

In a highly positive review, Steve Hochman of the Los Angeles Times called So Tonight That I Might See "far more narcotic and hypnotic than anything the whole techno-trance universe has digitally blipped up to date." NME described it as an "even more lustrous, becalmed work" than She Hangs Brightly, later placing it at number 44 on its year-end list of the best albums of 1993. Lorraine Ali of Rolling Stone was more critical, writing that the album's initially intriguing qualities grow "increasingly monotonous", while Robert Christgau of The Village Voice dismissed the album as a "dud".

AllMusic critic Ned Raggett retrospectively wrote that So Tonight That I Might See "remains the group's undisputed high point, mixing in plenty of variety among its tracks without losing sight of what made the group so special to begin with". In 2010, Pitchfork listed the track "Fade into You" at number 19 on its list of the top 200 tracks of the 1990s. In 2018, the website ranked So Tonight That I Might See at number two on its list of the 30 best dream pop albums.

Track listing

Personnel
Credits for So Tonight That I Might See adapted from album liner notes.

Mazzy Star
 Hope Sandoval – vocals, harmonica, guitar, tambourine
 David Roback – guitar, piano, keyboard, production

Additional personnel
 Jason Yates – bass
 Keith Mitchell – drums
 William Cooper – strings
 Dale Everingham – technical assistance

Charts

Certifications

References

External links
 
 

Mazzy Star albums
1993 albums
Capitol Records albums